G. M. Nelson (1899 – 1983) was an American politician. He served as a Republican member of the Florida House of Representatives.

Nelson served as a member of the Sarasota County Commissioner from 1955 to 1959. In 1961, he was elected to the Florida House of Representatives, where he served until 1962.

References 

1899 births
1983 deaths
Republican Party members of the Florida House of Representatives
20th-century American politicians